Tim Hurson (born 1946) is a speaker, writer and creativity theorist living in Toronto, Ontario, Canada. He was born in Johannesburg, South Africa, and grew up in New York City, USA. He is now a Canadian citizen. He was educated at The Peddie School in Hightstown, New Jersey, and went to college at Oberlin College in Ohio.

Hurson was a founding partner of Manifest Communications, a company focussed on social change strategy. He was its president until selling the company in 1996. After working independently for several years, he became a founding partner of ThinkX Intellectual Capital.

Hurson developed a problem-solving technique known as the ThinkX Productive Thinking Model, a six-step process that builds on the Osborn-Parnes Creative Problem Solving Process, combining it with more rigorous engineering-based techniques such as IDEF.

Hurson is a founding director of Facilitators Without Borders, a faculty member of the conference of the Creativity European Association. and co-founder of Mindcamp. He is a founding board member of Oberlin College's LaunchU Entrepreneurship bootcamp.

References

Further reading

External links

Tim Hurson website
ThinkX Intellectual Capital
Facilitators Without Borders
Mindcamp

1946 births
Living people
Creativity researchers
Peddie School alumni
Popular psychology
People from Johannesburg